Bonia Corporation Berhad is an international luxury fashion retailer based in Malaysia which has more than 700 sales outlets across Asia. It markets footwear, pizzazz leatherwear and accessories. It is also involved in other manufacturing businesses.

The company was founded in 1974  by Sang Sem Chiang, the Group's Executive Chairman, who started the business of designing, manufacturing, and wholesaling leather goods in Singapore.

It was listed on the KLCI Bursa Malaysia secondary bourse in 1994. It later was transferred to the Main Board of Bursa Malaysia.

For the fiscal year ending June 2011, Bonia had sales of 461.38 million Malaysian Ringgits. For the fiscal year ending June 2012, Bonia had sales of 579.81 million Malaysian Ringgits (US$182.39 million), which is 25.7% higher than in 2011. For the fiscal year ending June 2014, Bonia reported sales of 691.61 million Malaysia Ringgits (US$194.11 million), which increased 9.4% compared to the year 2013 when the company's sales were 632.32 million Malaysian Ringgits.

Bonia Corporation, Berhad gathers iconic heritage brands with a network of 555 retail outlets around the world.

See also
 Padini
 Parkson

References 

1974 establishments in Malaysia
Malaysian brands
Clothing brands
High fashion brands
Luxury brands
Companies based in Kuala Lumpur
Clothing companies established in 1974
Retail companies of Malaysia
Companies listed on Bursa Malaysia
Retail companies established in 1974
Malaysian companies established in 1974